The 2016–17 All-Ireland Intermediate Club Football Championship was the 14th staging of the All-Ireland Intermediate Club Football Championship since its establishment by the Gaelic Athletic Association for the 2003–04 season.

The All-Ireland final was played on 19 February 2017 at Croke Park in Dublin, between Westport and St. Colmcille's. Westport won the match by 2-12 to 3-08 to claim their first ever championship title.

All-Ireland Intermediate Club Football Championship

All-Ireland semi-finals

All-Ireland final

References

2016 in Irish sport
2017 in Irish sport
All-Ireland Intermediate Club Football Championship
All-Ireland Intermediate Club Football Championship